Model 10 or 10-model may refer to:

 Remington Model 10, a pump-action shotgun
 High Standard Model 10, a semi-automatic shotgun
 Smith & Wesson Model 10, a .38 revolver
 Lockheed Model 10 Electra, a twin engine monoplane prop airliner

See also
 Model X (disambiguation)